Sphingosine-1-phosphate receptor 4 also known as S1PR4 is a human gene which encodes a G protein-coupled receptor which binds the lipid signaling molecule sphingosine 1-phosphate (S1P).  Hence this receptor is also known as S1P4.

Function 

This gene is a member of the endothelial differentiation, G-protein-coupled (EDG) receptor gene family. EDG receptors bind lysophospholipids or lysosphingolipids as ligands, and are involved in cell signalling in many different cell types. This EDG receptor gene is intronless and is specifically expressed in the lymphoid tissue.

See also
 Lysophospholipid receptor

References

Further reading

External links

 

G protein-coupled receptors